Hyde Hall is a mansion in New York.

Hyde Hall may also refer to:

Hyde Hall, Denton, building in Greater Manchester, England
RHS Garden, Hyde Hall, Royal Horticultural Society's Garden in Essex, England
Hyde Hall, Sawbridgeworth, Hertfordshire, England